Richard Chbeir is a professor of computer science at the University of Pau and the Adour Region in France, 
where he leads the computer science laboratory called LIUPPA. He is the director of the Semantics & Privacy in Digital Ecosystems Research group (SPiDER). He is currently working on information and knowledge extraction.

Chbeir is the head of the OpenCEMS industrial chair and is the creator of the MEDES Conference.

Chbeir received his Ph.D. in computer science from the Institut national des sciences appliquées de Lyon in 2001 and got his Habilitation degree in 2010 from the University of Burgundy.

Selected publications
Joe Tekli, Richard Chbeir, Agma J. M. Traina, Caetano Traina Jr.:SemIndex+: A semantic indexing scheme for structured, unstructured, and partly structured data. Knowl. Based Syst. 164: 378-403(2019)
Irvin Dongo, Richard Chbeir: RiAiR: A Framework for Sensitive RDF Protection. J. Web Eng. 18(1-3): 43-96 (2019)
Fekade Getahun, Richard Chbeir: Multi-Query Optimization on RSS Feeds. J. Data Semant. 7(1): 47-64 (2018)
Elie Raad, Richard Chbeir, Albert Dipanda, Eliana J. Raad: Automatic rule generation using crowdsourcing for better relationship type discovery. Pervasive Mob. Comput. 36: 80-97 (2017)
Elie Raad, Bechara al Bouna, Richard Chbeir: Preventing sensitive relationships disclosure for better social media preservation. Int. J. Inf. Sec. 15(2): 173-194 (2016)

Published books
 Emergent Web Intelligence: Advanced Information Retrieval by Springer in 2010
 Emergent Web Intelligence: Advanced Semantic Technologies by Springer in 2010
 Security and Privacy Preserving in Social Networks by Springer in 2013
 Artificial Intelligence Applications and Innovations by Springer in 2015
 Advanced Internet Based Systems and Applications by Springer in 2009
 Signal Processing for Image Enhancement and Multimedia Processing Springer in 2008

References

External links 
 
 

Living people
Year of birth missing (living people)